Carex neoguinensis is a tussock-forming species of perennial sedge in the family Cyperaceae. It is native to New Guinea.

See also
List of Carex species

References

neoguinensis
Plants described in 1894
Taxa named by Charles Baron Clarke
Flora of New Guinea